Artsyom, also transliterated as Artsiom, is a popular masculine name in Belarus. It is a version of the name Artem/Artyom. Notable people with the name include:

 Artsyom Buloychyk, Belarusian footballer
 Artsyom Chelyadzinski, Belarusian footballer
 Artsyom Hancharyk, Belarusian footballer
Artsiom Parakhouski (born 1987), Belarusian basketball player
 Artsyom Salavey, Belarusian footballer
 Artsyom Skitaw, Belarusian footballer
 Artsyom Vaskow, Belarusian footballer

Belarusian masculine given names